Vistajet (never stylized VistaJet) was a Canadian low-cost airline based in Windsor, Ontario established in April 1997. Vistajet operated a fleet of leased Boeing 737-200 aircraft, but the airline ceased operations in September 1997, due to lower than expected passenger traffic.

History

Vistajet, based in Windsor, Ontario, entered the eastern Canada market in April 1997 as a low-cost carrier, but ceased operations in September 1997 due to lower than expected passenger traffic. The company planned to become a national carrier offering value-conscious leisure and business travelers the convenience of flying at a rate comparable to driving or taking the train.

The Globe & Mail reported that a consultant's report prepared for the board of Air Canada suggests that the premier airline in Canada was able to force out new competitors such as Vistajet by lowering prices and adding capacity during the 1990s.

Services
The airline operated services to Calgary, Winnipeg, Thunder Bay, Halifax, Ottawa, Toronto and Windsor.

Fleet
Vistajet operated a fleet consisting of Boeing 737-200 jetliners. The aircraft were leased.

Livery
Vistajet's aircraft were primarily painted in white, except for the tail, logo, and horizontal stripe on the fuselage.

The fuselage had the Vistajet logo printed in between the boarding door and the overwing exit, above the windows. Below the windows, there was a stripe that was divided into two colours, black at the top and maroon at the bottom.

The tail of the aircraft was primarily painted in maroon, with a white arc from the middle-left of the tail to the bottom-right of the tail.

See also 
 List of defunct airlines of Canada

References

External links
 Statistics Canada
 Parliamentary Business and Publications
 Institute for Global Ethics

Defunct airlines of Canada
Airlines established in 1997
Airlines disestablished in 1997